Rare Range is a rugged mountain range between the Wetmore and Irvine Glaciers, in Palmer Land. Discovered and photographed from the air by the Ronne Antarctic Research Expedition, 1947–48. Named by Advisory Committee on Antarctic Names (US-ACAN) (using the initials of the Ronne expedition) in recognition of the contributions made by this expedition to knowledge of Palmer Land and the Antarctic Peninsula area.

Mountain ranges of Palmer Land